is an underground metro station located in Shōwa-ku, Nagoya, Aichi Prefecture, Japan operated by the Nagoya Municipal Subway's Tsurumai Line. It is located 11.0 rail kilometers from the terminus of the Tsurumai Line at Kami-Otai Station.

History
Arahata Station was opened on 18 March 1977.

Lines

 (Station number: T11)

Layout
Arahata Station has two underground opposed side platforms. The platforms are as follows:

Platforms

References

External links

 Arahata Station official web site 

Railway stations in Japan opened in 1977
Railway stations in Aichi Prefecture